Stanislav Chokhlaev (born 16 July 1989) is a Russian male visually impaired cross-country skier and biathlete. He represented Russia at the 2014 Winter Paralympics and was successful in his maiden Paralympic competition, claiming three medals including 2 silver medals in the cross-country skiing event. In 2017, he was awarded the Return to Life Prize by the Russian Paralympic Committee.

Career 
Stanislav Chokhlaev competed at the 2014 Winter Paralympics with his guide Maksim Pirogov and went onto claim 2 medals in the cross-country skiing events and a bronze medal in the biathlon event.

He won the silver medal in the men's 12.5km visually impaired cross-country skiing event at the 2021 World Para Snow Sports Championships held in Lillehammer, Norway. He also won the silver medal in the men's long-distance visually impaired cross-country skiing event. In biathlon, he won the silver medal in the men's 6km visually impaired event. He also won the silver medal in the men's 10km visually impaired biathlon event.

Personal life 
Stanislav married fellow Russian visually impaired Paralympic Nordic skier, Iuliia Budaleeva. Iuliia Budaleeva also competed at the 2014 Winter Paralympics and excelled at her maiden Paralympic event similar to that of her husband by claiming three medals including a gold medal and two silver medals in the biathlon events and a bronze medal in cross-country skiing event.

References

External links
 

1989 births
Living people
Russian male biathletes
Russian male cross-country skiers
Cross-country skiers at the 2014 Winter Paralympics
Biathletes at the 2014 Winter Paralympics
Paralympic cross-country skiers of Russia
Paralympic biathletes of Russia
Paralympic silver medalists for Russia
Paralympic bronze medalists for Russia
Medalists at the 2014 Winter Paralympics
Russian blind people
Paralympic medalists in cross-country skiing
Paralympic medalists in biathlon
20th-century Russian people
21st-century Russian people